Umara Island is an island in the Sea of Okhotsk on the south side of Odyan Bay.

Geography
The island is 0.9 km long and is separated from the northern shore of the Koni Peninsula by a 1 km wide sound. There is a monitoring site for seabirds on the island.

Administratively this island is part of the Magadan Oblast.

References

Islands of the Sea of Okhotsk
Islands of the Russian Far East
Islands of Magadan Oblast
Uninhabited islands of Russia